"The Pictures on My Wall" is the first single released by the band Echo & the Bunnymen and was released in May 1979 in a limited issue of 4,000 copies. The single reached number twenty-four on the UK Indie Chart.

Releases
Having been released prior to Pete de Freitas joining the band, the single was re-recorded after he had joined and appeared as "Pictures on My Wall" on the 1980 album Crocodiles. In 1985 the single was also packaged with a limited edition version of the album Songs to Learn & Sing. The single was reissued in 1991 on the Document label as a maxi single on 12" (DV3T) and CD (DC3). The single was again reissued in 1995 on CD by Griffin Records (466 1995) with the text "Very first Echo and the Bunnymen single. Previously unavailable on CD" in white lettering on the cover.

Professional reviews
Allmusic  [ link]
Smash Hits (very favourable)

Track listings
"The Pictures on My Wall" (Ian McCulloch, Will Sergeant, Les Pattinson) – 2.52
"Read It in Books" (McCulloch, Julian Cope) – 2.59

References

1979 debut singles
1991 singles
1995 singles
Echo & the Bunnymen songs
Song recordings produced by Bill Drummond
Songs written by Ian McCulloch (singer)
Songs written by Will Sergeant
Songs written by Les Pattinson
1979 songs
Zoo Entertainment (record label) singles